Aida Babajanyan  (born on December 22, 1958), is an Armenian-Georgian actress and dancer. She is known for her roles on Own Enemy, and on The Leaders.

Filmography

References

External links 
 

1958 births
Living people
People from Samtskhe–Javakheti
Georgian people of Armenian descent
Armenian film actresses
21st-century Armenian actresses
Armenian stage actresses